Sand is a five-piece experimental rock/jazz/electronic group based in Chichester, England and was founded by Sue Klink Formed in 1998, its members are Tim Wright (electronics, keyboards and vocals), Hilary Jeffery (trombone), John Richards (double and electric bass), Neil Griffiths (guitar and films) and Rowan Oliver (drums/percussion). It should not be confused with the 1970s German band of the same name.

Sand was originally an offshoot of Tim Wright's Germ project, and members of the band are also involved in the band Scorn.

Sand performed live for the first time at The Spotted Cow in York in June 1995 with drummer Ben Clark.  

Their early work was dominated by a jazz aesthetic but as a relationship developed with Soul Jazz Records' owner Stuart Baker the sound became more focused and guitar oriented, whilst maintaining an improvisatory approach to recording and performing.  This led to three albums on the Soul Jazz label. They are: Beautiful People Are Evil (1999), Still Born Alive (2001), and The Dalston Shroud (2006) as well as 12"  vinyl EPs. 

Sand's collaboration with choreographer Saburo Teshigawara resulted in the creation of the piece Green, which has been performed at the New National Theatre, Tokyo (2000, 2002) and the Melbourne International Arts Festival (2005).

Discography
 1999 Beautiful People Are Evil (Soul Jazz Records)
 2001 Still Born Alive   (Soul Jazz Records)
 2006 The Dalston Shroud   (Soul Jazz Records)

References

External links
 Sand's website - www.mrsapple.com

English experimental rock groups
English techno music groups
Musical groups from Birmingham, West Midlands